WIVQ (103.3 FM, "Q 103.3") is a radio station licensed to serve Spring Valley, Illinois, United States, serving the La Salle-Peru area. The station is owned by The Radio Group and the broadcast license is held by Mendota Broadcasting, Inc.

WIVQ broadcasts a contemporary hit radio music format as a simulcast with sister station WSTQ.

The station was assigned the WIVQ call letters by the Federal Communications Commission on February 26, 2001.

History
WIVQ FM 103.3 began life as Talk Radio 103.3 FM WAIV in April 1994 according to the U.S. Federal Communications Commission's call sign database. It carried a right-wing talk format. In the spring of 1997 the station was sold along with co-owned WLRZ (now WBZG) from Crest Broadcasting to "The Radio Group" also known as Mendota Broadcasting. In July 1997 the station switched from all-talk to Light AC using ABC radio's star station format. It kept the AC format until March 6, 2000, at 9 PM when it dropped Light AC for the current top forty simulcast with WSTQ FM.

On January 24, 2023, it was announced that Studstill Media had sold WIVQ, along with its sister stations, to Shaw Media in Crystal Lake, Illinois, for a total of $1.8 million. The sale is presently under FCC review with anticipation of being completed later in the year.

References

External links
WIVQ official website

IVQ
Bureau County, Illinois
Contemporary hit radio stations in the United States
LaSalle County, Illinois